A Celebration of Guilt is the debut studio album released by death metal band Arsis.

Release 
The album was released March 30, 2004 in North America by Willowtip and on July 11, 2005 in Europe via Earache Records. On August 9, 2011, Willowtip released a remastered version of A Celebration of Guilt, which included two bonus tracks.

Reception

Critical reception 
Following its release, it was met with very favorable reviews by online publications such as AllMusic, Metal Storm, and Sputnikmusic.

Track listing

Personnel 
 James Malone – vocals, guitars, bass
 Mike Van Dyne – drums

Production 
Bob Gurske - engineering
Steve Carr - mixing, mastering
Mark Riddick - artwork, layout

External links

References

2004 debut albums
Arsis albums
Willowtip Records albums